Camilla "Ylla" Koffler (16 August 1911 – 30 March 1955) was a Hungarian photographer who specialized in animal photography. At the time of her death she "was generally considered the most proficient animal photographer in the world."

Biography
Koffler was born in Vienna, Austria, to a Romanian father and Croatian mother, both Hungarian nationals. At age eight, she was placed in a German boarding school in Budapest, Hungary. In 1926, the teenage Koffler joined her mother in Belgrade, Yugoslavia, where she studied sculpture with Italian Yugoslav sculptor Petar Pallavicini at the Academy of Fine Arts; finding that her given name Camilla was the same as the Serbian for "camel", she changed it to "Ylla" (pronounced ee-la).

In 1929, Ylla received a commission for a bas-relief sculpture for a Belgrade movie theater. By 1931, she had moved to Paris, France, where she studied sculpture at the Académie Colarossi and worked as photo retoucher and assistant to photographer Ergy Landau.

In 1932, Ylla began photographing animals, exhibited her work at Galerie de La Pléiade, and opened a studio to photograph pets. In 1933, she was introduced to Charles Rado and became a founding member of the RAPHO press agency.

In 1940, New York's Museum of Modern Art submitted her name to the U.S. Department of State requesting an entry visa; she immigrated to the United States in 1941.

In 1952, Ylla traveled to Africa, and in 1954 she visited India for the first time.

In 1953, en route with her mother to Cape Cod by plane, the plane ran out of fuel and crashed. Ylla, trapped under water, struggled to free herself and fainted upon reaching the surface. She was rescued by a fisherman, her mother drowned. Proceeds from wrongful death insurance helped pay for Ylla's journey through India the following year.

In 1955, Ylla was fatally injured after falling from a jeep while photographing a bullock cart race during festivities in Bharatpur, North India. The last photographs she ever took were published in the November 14, 1955 issue of Sports Illustrated.

Quotes and posthumous tributes
Julian Huxley:

Charles Rado:

Harry Phillips, Publisher of Sports Illustrated:

Movie Hatari! Character Based on Ylla
Her life work of photographing animals inspired famous movie director and producer, Howard Hawks, so much that he had his script writer, Leigh Brackett, change the script to create one of the main characters based on Ylla for his blockbuster movie, Hatari!, starring John Wayne. Hawks said, "We took that part of the story from a real character, a German girl. She was the best animal photographer in the world."<ref>Joseph McBride (writer), Hawks on Hawks”, University of California Press, 1982, pg 143, </ref> The movie character Anna Maria "Dallas" D’Alessandro is a photographer working for a zoo and was played by actress Elsa Martinelli.Scott Breivold, Peter Bogdanovich interviewer, “Howard Hawks: interviews”,  University Press of Mississippi, 2006, pg. 38, Thomas McIntyre, May/June 2012, “Fifty Years of HATARI! – The Story of Most Expensive Safari In the World”, Sports Afield, pg 70

Selected bibliography
1937 Chiens par Ylla/Ylla's Dog Fancies, Jules Supervielle (Paris: Editions OET/London: Methuen Publishers)
1937 Chats par Ylla, Paul Léautaud (Paris: Editions OET)
1938 Animal Language, Julian Huxley (includes recordings of animal calls) (London: Country Life Press; New York: Grosset & Dunlop; 2nd ed. 1964)
1944 They All Saw It, Margaret Wise Brown (New York: Harper & Brothers)
1947 The Sleepy Little Lion, Margaret Wise Brown (New York: Harper & Brothers)
1947 Le Petit Lion, Jacques Prévert (Paris: Arts et Métiers Graphiques)
1950 Tico-Tico, Niccolo Tucci (New York: Harper & Brothers); 1952: Georges Ribemont-Dessaignes (Paris: Libraire Gallimard)
1950 O Said the Squirrel, Margaret Wise Brown (London: Harvill Press)
1950 Des Bêtes..., Jacques Prévert (Lausanne: Edition Jean Marguerat; Paris: Libraire Gallimard)
1950 Animals, Julian Huxley (New York: Hastings House; London: Harvill Press)
1952 The Duck, Margaret Wise Brown (New York: Harper & Brothers; London: Harvill Press)
1953 Animals in Africa, L.S.B. Leakey (New York: Harper & Brothers; London: Harvill Press; Paris: Robert Delpire/Revue Neuf; Hamburg: Christian Wegner)
1956 Twee kleine beertjes = Deux petits ours, Paulette Falconnet (Brussel ; Amsterdam : Elsevier)
1958 Animals in India (Lausanne: La Guilde du Livre/Clairefontaine; New York: Harper & Brothers)

Notes

References
Beaumont Newhall: Photography 1839-1937 (Museum of Modern Art, New York, 1937)
John Szarkowski: The Photographer’s Eye (Museum of Modern Art, New York, 1966)
“Charles Rado, 71, of Photo Agency; Developed Popular Books from Ylla's Portfolio”, New York Times, October 5, 1970. (Obituary)Ylla (Musée Nicéphore Niépce, Chalon-sur-Saône, 1983)The Animal in Photography 1843-1985, ed. Alexandra Noble (The Photographers’ Gallery, London, 1986)Les Femmes Photographes de la Nouvelle Vision en France 1920-1940, Christian Bouqueret (Editions Marval, Paris, 1998)1000 Dogs'', ed. Raymond Merritt & Miles Barth (Taschen, Cologne, 2002)

External links
Biography, including a complete bibliography, examples of her portraits, and portraits of Ylla

1911 births
1955 deaths
Hungarian photographers
Nature photographers
Hungarian women artists
Hungarian people of Romanian descent
Académie Colarossi alumni
Hungarian women photographers
20th-century women photographers
Hungarian people of Croatian descent
Photographers from Vienna